Callopistria nobilior is a moth of the family Noctuidae. It is found in Taiwan and Japan.

The wingspan is 29–34 mm for males and 28–32 mm for females. The forewing ground colour is rufous, tinged with ochreous on the veins. The hindwings are fuscous.

The larvae have been recorded feeding on Histiopteris incisa, Microlepia krameri, Microlepia obtusiloba, Microlepia speluncae and Microlepia strigosa.

References

Moths described in 2000
Caradrinini
Moths of Japan
Moths of Taiwan